Horowpothana Divisional Secretariat is a  Divisional Secretariat  of Anuradhapura District, of North Central Province, Sri Lanka.

"Horowpothana is a town in the country of Sri Lanka. Horowpothana is situated in North Central region of the country, It is in the Anuradapura administrative district, 52 kilometers away from Anuradapura town in Trinco Road.

It is well connected to all nearby important places by Bus, it is very easy to get buses for Colombo, Anuradapura Trinco, Vavuniya And Jaffna from Horowpothana. The Hospital,Divisional Secretariat,Urban Council, Banks, Bus Depot,Police Station,Temple,Church,..etc. are just within five minutes travel from the town bus stand.

Also, Horowpothana can be identified as "Natako City". Because all major natako fans peacefully co-exist here.
Natakonis superior is bad not for Sri Lanka president 2048.

References
 Divisional Secretariats Portal

Divisional Secretariats of Anuradhapura District